The 1969 Monaco Grand Prix was a Formula One motor race held at the Circuit de Monaco on 18 May 1969. It was race 3 of 11 in both the 1969 World Championship of Drivers and the 1969 International Cup for Formula One Manufacturers.

The 80-lap race was won by Graham Hill, driving a works Lotus-Ford, after he started from fourth position. It was Hill's 14th and final World Championship race victory, and his fifth Monaco win, a record that would stand for 24 years. It was also the first win for a driver wearing a full face helmet in Formula One. Piers Courage finished second in a Brabham-Ford entered by Frank Williams, with Jo Siffert third in a Lotus-Ford entered by Rob Walker.

This was also the final Formula One race for Cooper as a constructor and Maserati as an engine supplier, Vic Elford finishing seventh and last in a car entered by Colin Crabbe.

Classification

Qualifying

Race

Championship standings after the race

Drivers' Championship standings

Constructors' Championship standings

References

Further reading

Monaco Grand Prix
Monaco Grand Prix
Grand Prix